Kaya Wilkins, better known as Okay Kaya, is a Norwegian-American musician and actress from New Jersey.

History
Wilkins was born in New Jersey and raised in Nesoddtangen, 4 miles outside of Oslo. Raised by her mother along with 5 brothers, she has both Scandinavian and African American roots.

Wilkins' first release as Okay Kaya was the song "Damn, Gravity", which was released in 2015. Wilkins released her first full-length album, Both, in 2018. The album was recorded with her boyfriend Aaron Maine of the band Porches. In 2020, Wilkins released her second full-length album under the moniker Okay Kaya titled Watch This Liquid Pour Itself in 2020 via Jagjaguwar. The album received three out of five stars from The Guardian. She played her first acting role in the Norwegian drama Thelma. In August 2020, Wilkins released her mixtape, Surviving is the New Living.

Discography

Studio albums

Mixtapes

Singles

As lead artist

As featured artist

Promotional singles

Guest appearances

Filmography

References

1990 births
21st-century American women singers
African-American women singer-songwriters
American emigrants to Norway
American folk singers
American people of Norwegian descent
Jagjaguwar artists
Norwegian people of African-American descent
Norwegian pop musicians
XL Recordings artists
Living people
21st-century American singers
21st-century African-American women